Forrest Ashcraft (July 13, 1922 – February 19, 2004) was an American politician who served in the Iowa Senate from the 41st district from 1977 to 1979.

He died on February 19, 2004, in Davenport, Iowa at age 81.

References

1922 births
2004 deaths
Republican Party Iowa state senators
20th-century American politicians
People from Davenport, Iowa